Mijaaj is a 2018 Indian Gujarati action drama film directed by Tapan Vyas, written by Pravin Pandya and produced by Jitendra Pandya. It stars Malhar Thakar, Esha Kansara, Revanta Sarabhai, Abhinay Banker, Chhaya Vora, Jayesh More, Bhatt Bhushan, Andy von Eich & Kajal Pisal.

Cast

 Malhar Thakar as Jay
 Esha Kansara as Jahnvi
 Revanta Sarabhai as Yogesh
 Abhinay Banker as VP
 Chhaya Vora as Sarita Ben
 Jayesh More
 Bhatt Bhushan
 Andy von Eich
 Kajal Pisal

Soundtrack
Meghdhanush composed the music and lyrics were written by Priya Saraiya under the label of Krup Music.

Release
It released on 5 January 2018 in various cities in Gujarat, as well as Mumbai.

References

External links
 

2018 films
Indian action drama films
2010s Gujarati-language films
2018 action drama films